Luke Hinton is a Grand Prix motorcycle racer from Great Britain.

Career statistics

By season

Races by year

References

External links
 Profile on motogp.com

British motorcycle racers
Living people
1990 births
125cc World Championship riders